Gry Roaldseth (born ) is a Norwegian female curler and coach.

Record as a coach of national teams

References

External links

Living people
1969 births
Norwegian female curlers
Norwegian curling coaches